Mendrad Kigola (born 10 December 1969) is a Tanzanian CCM politician and Member of Parliament for Mufindi South constituency since 2010.

References

1969 births
Living people
Chama Cha Mapinduzi MPs
Tanzanian MPs 2010–2015
Sangu Secondary School alumni
Institute of Finance Management alumni
Tumaini University Makumira alumni
Alumni of the University of Strathclyde